Aimé Verhoeven (18 December 1935 – 19 May 2021) was a Belgian wrestler. He competed in the men's Greco-Roman bantamweight at the 1960 Summer Olympics.

References

External links
 

1935 births
2021 deaths
Belgian male sport wrestlers
Olympic wrestlers of Belgium
Wrestlers at the 1960 Summer Olympics
Sportspeople from Antwerp